Michael Sweeney was an Irish-American track and field athlete. He was the high jumping world champion in 1892 and 1895. He was also the professional athletics champion at the 1900 Paris Olympics in the 100-meter dash, the high jump, and the long jump.

He was the holder of the world high jump record at 1.97 m, and known as an innovator in the progress of high jump technique through his development of the eastern cut-off style. After his high jumping career, Sweeney became a track and field coach at Yale, as well as at The Hill School.

References

American track and field coaches
American male high jumpers
American people of Irish descent
American male long jumpers
American male sprinters
Year of birth missing
Year of death missing
The Hill School faculty